Philip Brodie may refer to:

 Philip Brodie, Lord Brodie (born 1950), Scottish lawyer and judge
 Philip Brodie (actor) (born 1975), British actor and writer